David John Atkins (born 2 April 1966) is a British businessman. He is the former-chief executive of Hammerson plc, a British property development and investment company, and the UK's third-largest listed property company.

Early life
He has a BSc degree from the University of Reading. He is a chartered surveyor.

Career
He became chief executive of Hammerson on 1 October 2009 and was named president of the company in 2015. He joined Hammerson in 1998, and was appointed to the board on 1 January 2007. He was replaced by Rita-Rose Gagné as chief executive officer and executive director in September 2020. Atkins began his career with DTZ in 1988.

He is also chairman of the European Public Real Estate Association (EPRA).

Personal life
He is married.

References

1966 births
Living people
British chief executives
British corporate directors
Alumni of the University of Reading